Georg Fabri, O.P. (died 1498) was a Roman Catholic prelate who served as Auxiliary Bishop of Mainz (1490–1498).

Biography
Georg Fabri was ordained a priest in the Order of Preachers. On 15 Jan 1490, he was appointed during the papacy of Pope Innocent VIII as Auxiliary Bishop of Mainz and Titular Bishop of Bir Seba. On 13 Mar 1490, he was consecrated bishop. He served as Auxiliary Bishop of Mainz until his death in 1498.

References

External links and additional sources
 (for Chronology of Bishops) 
 (for Chronology of Bishops)  

15th-century Roman Catholic bishops in the Holy Roman Empire
Bishops appointed by Pope Innocent VIII
1498 deaths
Dominican bishops